Grunwald may refer to:

Places

Administrative
 Grunwald, Warmian-Masurian Voivodeship, a village in northern Poland
 Gmina Grunwald, a municipality containing the village of Grunwald
 Grunwald, Poznań, a district of the city of Poznań in western Poland
 Grunwald, Łódź Voivodeship, a village in central Poland

Non-administrative
 Grunwald Monument (Pomnik Grunwaldzki), erected in 1910 in Kraków, Poland
 Grunwald, a sanatorium in Sokołowsko, Poland
Grunwaldzka street in Bydgoszcz

Sports
 Grunwald Poznań (sports club), a sports club with many different sections including:
 Grunwald Poznań (field hockey)
 Grunwald Poznań (football)
 Grunwald Poznań (handball)
 Grunwald Wilno, the Polish name for a Lithuanian football club

Other uses
 Grunwald (surname)
 Battle of Grunwald, a decisive battle fought in 1410 in what is now northern Poland

See also
 Greenwald, a surname
 Žalgiris (disambiguation)
 Grunewald (disambiguation)
 Grünwald (disambiguation)

ro:Grünwald (dezambiguizare)